Emanuele Pio Cicerelli (born 12 August 1994) is an Italian professional football player who plays as a winger and midfielder for  club Reggina, on loan from Lazio.

Club career
He made his Serie C debut for Barletta on 17 March 2013 in a game against Andria BAT.

On 31 January 2020, his rights were sold to Lazio, who loaned him back to Salernitana.

On 31 August 2021, he joined Frosinone on loan.

On 27 July 2022, Cicerelli was loaned to Reggina, with a conditional obligation to buy.

References

External links
 

1994 births
Living people
People from San Giovanni Rotondo
Footballers from Apulia
Italian footballers
Association football forwards
Calcio Foggia 1920 players
A.S.D. Barletta 1922 players
S.F. Aversa Normanna players
A.S. Melfi players
Paganese Calcio 1926 players
U.S. Salernitana 1919 players
Pordenone Calcio players
Frosinone Calcio players
Reggina 1914 players
Serie B players
Serie C players
Sportspeople from the Province of Foggia